Jerome Moon is an American politician who serves as a member of the Tennessee House of Representatives. He represents part of Blount County in Maryville, TN, which is also known as Tennessee's District 8. Moon, the former chair of the Blount County Commission, was appointed the State House seat vacated by Art Swann on December 13, 2017.

References

External links

1947 births
Living people
Republican Party members of the Tennessee House of Representatives
21st-century American politicians
People from Maryville, Tennessee
University of Tennessee alumni